Aldergrove is the name of multiple places:

 Aldergrove, Langley, a neighbourhood in British Columbia, Canada
 Aldergrove, County Antrim, a hamlet in Northern Ireland close to the site of:
Joint Helicopter Command Flying Station Aldergrove
Aldergrove Airport, now Belfast International Airport
 Aldergrove, Edmonton, a neighbourhood in Alberta, Canada